Eskild Balschmidt Ebbesen (born 27 May 1972, in Silkeborg, Midtjylland) is a Danish lightweight rower, who as part of the Gold Four has won a total number of five Olympic medals (three gold) and six World Championship gold medals.

Ebbesen was the flag bearer of the Danish team at the opening ceremony of the 2004 Summer Olympics in Athens, Greece.

Ebbesen and his crew took an alternative approach to racing and is quoted saying: Our strategy, for every race, was always to be first, to be number one from the beginning of the race. A fast start was important. It became natural for us to do a high stroke rate. It then escalated. I don't think we have many strokes under 40.

Ebbesen retired from competitive rowing at the age of 40 after the 2012 London Olympics. In the following year, he won the Thomas Keller Medal, the highest honour in rowing.

References

External links
 

1972 births
Living people
Danish male rowers
Olympic rowers of Denmark
Rowers at the 1996 Summer Olympics
Rowers at the 2000 Summer Olympics
Rowers at the 2004 Summer Olympics
Rowers at the 2008 Summer Olympics
Rowers at the 2012 Summer Olympics
Olympic gold medalists for Denmark
Olympic bronze medalists for Denmark
People from Silkeborg
Olympic medalists in rowing
Medalists at the 2012 Summer Olympics
Medalists at the 2008 Summer Olympics
Medalists at the 2004 Summer Olympics
Medalists at the 2000 Summer Olympics
Medalists at the 1996 Summer Olympics
World Rowing Championships medalists for Denmark
Thomas Keller Medal recipients
Sportspeople from the Central Denmark Region